Patrick Clohessy (16 April 1908 – 6 August 1971) was an Irish sportsperson and politician. He played hurling for his local club Fedamore and at senior level for the Limerick county team from 1928 until 1940. He later became a Fianna Fáil politician.

Playing career

Club
Clohessy played club hurling with his local club in Fedamore. His brothers, Dave, Andy and Jack, also played for Fedamore. He won his sole senior county title with the club in 1927.

Inter-county
Clohessy first came to prominence on the inter-county scene as a member of the Limerick senior hurling team in 1928. At that stage Limerick were down the pecking order in terms of the top teams in the Munster Championship.

All this changed in 1933 when Limerick defeated the reigning provincial champions of Clare, giving Clohessy his first Munster title. The subsequent All-Ireland final pitted Limerick against Kilkenny – the winners of the championship in 1932. The game was a low-scoring affair with Kilkenny claiming the title on a score line of 1–7 to 0–6.

In 1934 Limerick began their fight back with Clohessy added a second Munster medal to his collection as the team beat Waterford. In their second consecutive All-Ireland final appearance Limerick faced Dublin. Dublin proved to be no pushover as the game ended in a draw on a score line of 2–7 to 3–4. The replay saw Limerick capture the title by five points giving Clohessy his first All-Ireland medal.

1935 saw Limerick capture Clohessy win his first National Hurling League title, however, he later missed out on a third Munster title due to injury. Clohessy was back for the All-Ireland final as Limerick took on Kilkenny once again. Limerick had a run of 31 unbeaten games; however, Kilkenny put an end to this by defeating Clohessy's team by just a single point.

In 1936 Clohessy added a second National League medal to his collection before collecting a third Munster medal. For the third time in four years Kilkenny provided the opposition in the subsequent All-Ireland final.  Limerick, however, had the measure of them on the day and claimed victory on a score line of 5–6 to 1–5. It was Clohessy's second All-Ireland medal.

In 1937 Clohessy captured a fourth consecutive National League medal; however, Limerick later lost their provincial title for the first time since 1932. Three years later in 1940 Limerick regained their Munster title after an epic battle with Cork giving Clohessy his fourth provincial title. In the subsequent All-Ireland final the two outstanding teams of the decade, Kilkenny and Limerick, did battle once again. Kilkenny were not the force of old as a third All-Ireland medal went to Clohessy following a 3–7 to 1–7 victory. It was Clohessy's last major title with the Limerick inter-county hurlers as he retired from inter-county hurling following the victory.

Provincial
Clohessy also lined out with Munster in the inter-provincial hurling competition. He first played for his province in 1932, however, on that occasion his side was defeated by Leinster.  Clohessy remained on the team and helped Munster to capture the Railway Cup title in 1934. He won a further four title sin-a-row in 1937, 1938, 1939 and 1940.

Political career
A farmer by profession, he contested the 1954 general election in the Limerick East constituency but was not elected. He was elected to Dáil Éireann as a Fianna Fáil Teachta Dála (TD) at the subsequent 1957 general election and held his seat until retiring at the 1969 general election.

His nephew Peadar Clohessy was a Fianna Fáil and Progressive Democrats TD for Limerick East in the 1980s and 1990s.

See also
Families in the Oireachtas

References

Sources
Corry, Eoghan, The GAA Book of Lists (Hodder Headline Ireland, 2005).

External links
Munster final winning teams
Limerick GAA honours

1908 births
1971 deaths
All-Ireland Senior Hurling Championship winners
Fedamore hurlers
Fianna Fáil TDs
Irish farmers
Irish sportsperson-politicians
Limerick inter-county hurlers
Members of the 16th Dáil
Members of the 17th Dáil
Members of the 18th Dáil
Munster inter-provincial hurlers
Politicians from County Limerick